Blow Up is a live album by jazz vibraphonist Bobby Hutcherson, released on the Jazz Music Yesterday label.

Composition

Track listing
"Spiral" (Chambers) - 13:40
"Blow-Up" (Herbie Hancock) - 14:32
"Herzog" (Hutcherson) - 14:30
"Maiden Voyage" (Hancock) - 11:40
"Man on Mercury" (Land) - 1:56

Personnel
Bobby Hutcherson - vibraphone
Harold Land - tenor saxophone
Stanley Cowell - piano
Reggie Johnson - bass
Joe Chambers - drums

References 

Bobby Hutcherson albums
1990 live albums
Live post-bop albums
Albums recorded at Jazz à Juan